Île Vanier is one of the Queen Elizabeth Islands of the Canadian arctic islands in Nunavut, Canada. To the north, across the Arnott Strait, is Cameron Island, and to the south, across the Pearse Strait, is Massey Island. Île Vanier is uninhabited.

The first known sighting of the island was by Robert Dawes Aldrich in 1851, but its insular nature wasn't proven until the 1950s.

Adam Range reaches elevations in excess of 220 meters.

References

External links
 Vanier Island in the Atlas of Canada - Toporama; Natural Resources Canada

Islands of the Queen Elizabeth Islands
Uninhabited islands of Qikiqtaaluk Region